is a Japanese software development house. The company's main products were a word processor, Ichitaro ("JohnnyOne"), a Japanese input method, ATOK. In 2010s, they focus on correspondence education and enterprise software.

Description
JustSystems is based in Tokushima on Shikoku island in Japan.  Its most recent business has focused on Java and XML-themed technology development. As of 2012, JustSystems is the only Japanese full member of the Unicode Consortium.

History
JustSystems was founded in 1979 by Hatsuko and Kazunori Ukigawa, and was incorporated in June 1981.  Early in the company's history, it created one of the first computer input methods for Japanese users, creating compatibility between QWERTY keyboards and Kanji characters.  In the mid-1990s, JustSystems founded the Justsystem Pittsburgh Research Center near Carnegie Mellon University.  In 1996, JustSystems purchased Claritech, a Carnegie Mellon startup run by David Evans, and renamed it JustSystems Evans Research (JSERI).  In 1997, JustSystems went public and was listed on the JASDAQ Securities Exchange.

In 2006, JustSystems purchased the XMetaL XML authoring suite from Blast Radius to complement its xfy XML development platform.  In 2009, Keyence Corporation became the largest shareholder of JustSystems.  Later that year, Kazunori and Hatsuko Ukigawa resigned from the company.

See also
 Justsystem Pittsburgh Research Center

References

External links
 JustSystems 
 JustSystems 
 Ticker of the company in Google Finance 

Software companies of Japan
Companies based in Tokushima Prefecture
Software companies established in 1979
Japanese brands
Companies listed on the Tokyo Stock Exchange
Japanese companies established in 1979